The 15 Largest Trading Partners of Japan

These figures do not include services or foreign direct investment, but only trade in goods. The fifteen largest Japanese trading partners with their total trade (sum of imports and exports) in billions of US Dollars for calendar year 2021 are as follows:

Japan is also the dominant export partner of the following:

See also 

 Economy of Japan
 List of the largest trading partners of the United States
 List of the largest trading partners of China
 List of the largest trading partners of Russia
 List of the largest trading partners of Germany
 List of the largest trading partners of the European Union

References 

Business in Japan
Lists of trading partners